August Nathanael Grischow (29 September 1726 in Berlin – 4 June 1760 in Saint Petersburg) was a German mathematician and astronomer. He was the son of the mathematician and meteorologist. From 1745 until 1749 Augustin Nathanael Grischow was Director of the old Berlin Observatory. In 1749 he became a Member of the Prussian Academy of Sciences. In 1750 he became Professor of Optics at the Berlin Academy of Arts. In 1751 he gave up this post in order to become Professor of Astronomy and Member of the Russian Academy of Sciences in Saint Petersburg. There he concerned himself mainly with the theory of the parallax of celestial objects, primarily the Moon.

Publications 
Methodus investigandi parallaxin lunae et planetarum.
Observationes circa longitudinem penduli simplices institutae. 1760

External links 
 Akademie der Künste: Augustin Nathanael Grischow

References

18th-century German mathematicians
1726 births
1760 deaths
Full members of the Saint Petersburg Academy of Sciences